Neck stiffness, stiff neck and nuchal rigidity are terms often used interchangeably to describe the medical condition when one experiences discomfort or pain when trying to turn, move, or flex the neck. Possible causes include muscle strain or sprain, cervical spine disorders, meningitis, and subarachnoid hemorrhage.

Nuchal rigidity due to irritation of the lining of the brain and spinal cord is one of the main symptoms of meningitis.

See also
 Neck pain
 Acquired torticollis

References

Human head and neck